The 2011 Sultan Azlan Shah Cup is the 20th edition of the Sultan Azlan Shah Cup. It was held from 5–15 May 2011 in Ipoh, Perak, Malaysia.

Participating nations
Seven countries participated in this year's tournament:

Results
All times are Malaysia Standard Time (UTC+08:00)

Pool

Classification

Fifth and sixth place

Third and fourth place

Final

Awards

Individual awards
The following awards were presented at the conclusion of the tournament:

All Star team
The following players were named in the Azlan Shah All Star team at the conclusion of the tournament:

Statistics

Final standings

Goalscorers

References

External links
Official website

2011
2011 in field hockey
2011 in Malaysian sport
2011 in Australian field hockey
2011 in New Zealand sport
2011 in Pakistani sport
2011 in South Korean sport
2011 in Indian sport
2011 in British sport
May 2011 sports events in Asia